Philbouchetia is a genus of air-breathing land snails, terrestrial pulmonate gastropod mollusks in the family Camaenidae.

Species
 Philbouchetia franzhuberi Thach, 2020 (length : 30.6 mm; dsitribution: Laos)

References

 Thach N.N. (2020). New shells of South Asia. Volume 2. Seashells*Freshwater*Land snails. With one New Genus and 140 New Species & Subspecies, Reply to comments made in error. 48HRBooks Company, Akron, Ohio, USA. 189 pp.

External links
 

Camaenidae